The following article presents a summary of the 2004 football (soccer) season in Brazil, which was the 103rd season of competitive football in the country.

Campeonato Brasileiro Série A

Santos declared as the Campeonato Brasileiro champions.

Relegation
The four worst placed teams, which are Criciúma, Guarani, Vitória and Grêmio, were relegated to the following year's second level.

Campeonato Brasileiro Série B

Brasiliense declared as the Campeonato Brasileiro Série B champions.

Promotion
The two best placed teams in the final stage of the competition, which are Brasiliense and Fortaleza, were promoted to the following year's first level.

Relegation
The six worst placed teams, which are América-RN, Remo, América-MG, Joinville, Mogi Mirim and Londrina, were relegated to the following year's third level.

Campeonato Brasileiro Série C

União Barbarense declared as the Campeonato Brasileiro Série C champions.

Promotion
The two best placed teams in the final stage of the competition, which are União Barbarense and Gama, were promoted to the following year's second level.

Copa do Brasil

The Copa do Brasil final was played between Santo André and Flamengo.

Santo André declared as the cup champions by aggregate score of 4-2.

State championship champions

Youth competition champions

Other competition champions

Brazilian clubs in international competitions

Brazil national team
The following table lists all the games played by the Brazil national football team in official competitions and friendly matches during 2004.

Women's football

Brazil women's national football team
The following table lists all the games played by the Brazil women's national football team in official competitions and friendly matches during 2004.

The Brazil women's national football team competed in the following competitions in 2004:

Domestic competition champions

References

 Brazilian competitions at RSSSF
 2004 Brazil national team matches at RSSSF
 2004-2007 Brazil women's national team matches at RSSSF

 
Seasons in Brazilian football
Brazil